Carola Baer-von Mathes (1857–1940) was a German landscape painter.

Biography
Baer-von Mathes was born on 26 September 1857 in Ried im Innkreis, Austria.

She was married to fellow painter . She exhibited her work at the Woman's Building at the 1893 World's Columbian Exposition in Chicago, Illinois.

From 1891 to 1899 she exhibited regularly in the Munich Glaspalast, also at the Munich Secession, in the Kunstverein and on the occasion of the exhibitions of the Artists' Association, including in 1903 in the exhibition of works by Munich artists in the Künstlerhaus on the occasion of the 3rd Bavarian Women's Day.

From 1890 to 1894, Baer-von Mathes was director of the landscape and still life class of the Munich Artists' Association and taught at the women's academy that emerged from this until the 1930s.

She died on 9 September 1940 in Munich.

References

External links
 images of Carola Baer-von Mathes' work on ArtNet

1857 births
1940 deaths
19th-century German women artists
20th-century German women artists
19th-century German painters
20th-century German painters